Diocese of Ottawa may refer to:
 Anglican Diocese of Ottawa
 Roman Catholic Archdiocese of Ottawa